Barrie Penrose (26 January 1942 – 5 July 2020) was a British investigative journalist, interviewer and trainer.

Life and career 
Born in Croydon, Penrose was educated at John Ruskin Grammar School and later at the London School of Economics.

He worked for the New York Herald Tribune in Paris, The Observer, The Sunday Times and BBC Television, initially as Barrie Sturt-Penrose.

In December 1979, John Cairncross – who had secretly admitted to an MI6 interrogator that he had spied for the Soviets – was approached by Penrose and made a full confession to the journalist. The news was widely publicized, leading many to believe that Cairncross was the so-called "fifth man" of the Cambridge Five spy ring. This designation would be confirmed in 1989 by KGB agent Oleg Gordievsky, who defected to Britain.  

Penrose wrote The Pencourt File (with BBC colleague Roger Courtiour) based on information recounted by Harold Wilson, shortly after he had resigned as British prime minister. Wilson had requested contact with the journalists about conspiracies that he claimed had occurred during his period in government.

Penrose died on 5 July 2020 due to complications of Parkinson's disease.

Bibliography

References

1942 births
2020 deaths
People from Croydon
British investigative journalists
Neurological disease deaths in the United Kingdom
Deaths from Parkinson's disease
People educated at John Ruskin Grammar School
Alumni of the London School of Economics